Ex with Benefits is a 2015 Filipino romantic erotic drama film starring Derek Ramsay, Coleen Garcia and Meg Imperial. Based on a Wattpad story written by Ruth Mendoza, the screenplay was made by Keiko Aquino and Jeff Stelton and directed by Gino M. Santos. It was released on September 2, 2015 by Star Cinema (together with Skylight Films), and Viva Films.

Plot 
After a tumultuous med school romance that comes to an abrupt end, Dr. Adam Castrances and Arkisha "Arki" Aragon meet again ten years later. Arki is a pharmaceutical sales representative with a track record of doing anything to make a sale. Adam is a doctor of sports medicine with a successful blog and commitment issues. When Arki finds that it will take more than her usual sales tactics to convince Adam to endorse her product, she does her best to step up her game without falling in love again but eventually fails. Their second chance at love is tested, however, when the reasons for their med school breakup come to the surface.

Cast 
 Derek Ramsay as Dr. Adam Jacob Castrances, MD
 Coleen Garcia as Arkisha Aragon
 Meg Imperial as Scarlet
 Rayver Cruz as Andrew
 Tirso Cruz III as Jimmy
 Carmi Martin as Bobby
 Kitkat as Genelyn
 Nina Ricci Alagao
 Juan Rodrigo
 Jobelle Salvador
 Menggie Cobarrubias

See also 
List of Filipino films in 2015
List of Philippine films based on Wattpad stories

References

External links 
 

2015 films
Philippine romantic drama films
2015 romantic drama films
2010s Tagalog-language films
2010s English-language films
Star Cinema films
Viva Films films
Philippine LGBT-related films
2010s erotic drama films
Erotic romance films
2015 multilingual films
Philippine multilingual films